The Washington Commanders are a professional American football team based in the Washington metropolitan area. Formerly known as the Washington Redskins, the team competes in the National Football League (NFL) as a member of the National Football Conference (NFC) East division. The team plays its home games at FedExField in Landover, Maryland; its headquarters and training facility are in Ashburn, Virginia. The team has played more than 1,000 games and is one of only five in the NFL with more than 600 total wins. Washington was among the first NFL franchises with a fight song, "Hail to the Commanders", which is played by their marching band after every touchdown scored by the team at home. The franchise is valued by Forbes at 5.6 billion, making them the league's sixth-most valuable team .

The team was founded in 1932 as the Boston Braves, changing its name to the Redskins the following year before moving to Washington, D.C., in 1937. The Redskins branding was seen as pejorative by many for decades. In 2020, pressure from several NFL and team sponsors led to its being retired as part of a wave of name changes in the wake of the George Floyd protests, and mainly because of awareness of the Native American mascot controversy revived by the aforementioned protests. The team played as the Washington Football Team for two seasons before rebranding as the Commanders in 2022.

Washington won the 1937 and 1942 NFL championship games and Super Bowls XVII, XXII, and XXVI. Washington has finished a season as league runner-up six times, losing the 1936, 1940, 1943, and 1945 title games and Super Bowls VII and XVIII. Their three Super Bowl wins are tied with the Denver Broncos, Kansas City Chiefs and Las Vegas Raiders, behind the Pittsburgh Steelers and New England Patriots (six each), San Francisco 49ers and Dallas Cowboys (five each), and the Green Bay Packers and New York Giants (four each).

All of Washington's championships were attained during two 10-year spans. From 1936 to 1945, the team went to the NFL Championship six times, winning two of them. The second period lasted from 1982 to 1991, when they appeared in the postseason seven times, captured four Conference titles, and won three Super Bowls in four appearances. From 1946 to 1970, Washington posted just four winning seasons and never reached the postseason. They went without a single winning season from 1956 to 1968, a span that included their worst regular-season record: 1–12–1 in 1961. Since their last Super Bowl appearance and victory in 1991, they have won the NFC East four times, had a winning record in nine seasons and reached the postseason in seven.

Franchise history

George Preston Marshall era (1932–1968)

The city of Boston was awarded an NFL franchise on July 9, 1932, under the ownership of American businessman George Preston Marshall. The team was named after the Boston Braves baseball team, with whom they shared Braves Field. The following year the team moved to Fenway Park, home of the Boston Red Sox, and changed the team's name to the "Redskins". Marshall hired William Henry "Lone Star" Dietz, who claimed to be part Sioux, as the team's head coach.

Ray Flaherty years (1936–1942) 
The Redskins appeared in the 1936 NFL Championship Game, their first championship appearance, but lost to the Green Bay Packers 21–6.

NFL champions (1937) 
The Redskins moved to Washington, D.C., after just five years in Boston, with Marshall stating that the city showed a lack of interest in the team. Through 1960, the team shared baseball's Griffith Stadium with the first American League Washington Senators baseball team. In their first game in Washington, the Redskins defeated the New York Giants in the season opener, 13–3. That same season, they earned their first division title in Washington with a  win over the Giants. Shortly after, the team won their first league championship in 1937, defeating the Chicago Bears.

In 1940, the Redskins met the Bears again in the 1940 NFL Championship Game. The result,  in favor of the Bears, remains the worst one-sided loss in NFL history.

NFL champions (1942) 
In what became an early rivalry in the NFL, the Redskins and Bears met twice more in the NFL Championship Game: in 1942, the Redskins won their second championship,

Bergman and DeGroot years (1943–1945) 
In 1943, Dutch Bergman was named head coach and led the team to a return to the NFL championship game, however they were defeated by the Chicago Bears  That same season, Sammy Baugh led the NFL in passing, punting, and interceptions.

The Redskins played in the NFL Championship one more time before a quarter-century drought that lasted until the 1972 season. With former Olympic gold medalist Dudley DeGroot as their new head coach, the Redskins went 8–2 during the 1945 season. One of the most impressive performances came from Baugh, who had a completion percentage of .703. They ended the season by losing to the Cleveland Rams in the 1945 NFL Championship Game, 15–14. The one-point margin of victory came under scrutiny because of a safety that occurred early in the game. In the first quarter, the Redskins had the ball at their own 5-yard line. Dropping back into the end zone, quarterback Baugh threw to an open receiver, but the ball hit the goal post and bounced back to the ground in the end zone. Under the rules at the time, this was ruled as a safety and thus gave the Rams a 2–0 lead. Marshall was so upset at the outcome that he became a major force in passing a major rule change after the season, in which a forward pass that struck the goalpost was automatically ruled incomplete. This later became known as the "Baugh/Marshall Rule".

The team's early success endeared it to the fans of Washington, D.C. However, after 1945, the Redskins began a slow decline that they did not end until a playoff appearance in the 1971 season. The Redskins had four different head coaches from 1946 to 1951, including former players Turk Edwards and Dick Todd as well as John Whelchel and Herman Ball, and none were successful. But this did not stop George Preston Marshall from trying to make the Redskins the most successful franchise in the league. His first major alteration happened on June 14, 1950, when it was announced that American Oil Company planned to televise all Redskins games, making Washington the first NFL team to have an entire season of televised games. His next major change came in February 1952, when he hired former Green Bay Packers coach Earl "Curly" Lambeau. But, after two seasons, Marshall fired Lambeau following the Redskins loss in their exhibition opener to the Los Angeles Rams and hired Joe Kuharich. In 1955, Kuharich led the Redskins to their first winning season in ten years and was named both Sporting News Coach of the Year and UPI NFL Coach of the Year.

In 1961, the Redskins moved into their new stadium called D.C. Stadium (changed to Robert F. Kennedy Memorial Stadium in 1969). The first game in new D.C. Stadium occurred on October 1 in front of 37,767 fans. During his tenure, he helped draft future stars: wide receiver Charley Taylor, tight end Jerry Smith, safety Paul Krause, center Len Hauss, and linebacker Chris Hanburger. He also helped pull off two important trades, gaining quarterback Sonny Jurgensen from the Philadelphia Eagles and linebacker Sam Huff from the New York Giants.

One reason for the team's struggles was disarray in the front office. Marshall began a mental decline in 1962, and the team's other stockholders found it difficult to make decisions without their boss. Marshall died on August 9, 1969, and Edward Bennett Williams, a minority stockholder who was a Washington local and attorney, was chosen to run the franchise while the majority stockholder, Jack Kent Cooke, lived on the West Coast in Los Angeles and ran his basketball team, the Los Angeles Lakers. In 1966, Otto Graham was hired as the new head coach. Graham coached the Redskins for three seasons, but whatever magic he had as an NFL player disappeared on the sidelines as the team recorded a mark of 17–22–3 during that time period. He resigned after the 1968 season in favor of Vince Lombardi, and became athletic director of the Coast Guard Academy before retiring at the end of 1984.

Integration controversy

During most of this unsuccessful period, Marshall continually refused to integrate the team, despite pressure from The Washington Post and the federal government. Two months into the Kennedy administration on March 24, 1961, Secretary of the Interior Stewart Udall warned Marshall to hire black players or face federal retribution. For the first time in history, the federal government had attempted to desegregate a professional sports team. The Redskins were under the threat of civil rights legal action by the Kennedy administration, which would have prevented a segregated team from playing at the new federally-owned D.C. Stadium, managed by the U.S. Department of the Interior. The Redskins' previous venue, Griffith Stadium, was owned by the Griffith family, owners of the Washington Senators, who moved and became the Minnesota Twins in 1961.

In 1962, Washington became the final professional American football franchise to integrate. First, the Redskins selected running back Ernie Davis of Syracuse first overall in the 1962 NFL Draft; Davis was the first black player to win the Heisman Trophy and the first to be the top selection in an NFL draft. Washington also took fullback Ron Hatcher of Michigan State in the eighth round, who became the first black player to sign a contract with the team.

In mid-December 1961, Marshall announced that on draft day, he had traded the rights to Davis to the Cleveland Browns, who wanted Davis to join the league's leading rusher, Jim Brown, in their backfield. Davis was traded for veteran running back Bobby Mitchell (who became a wide receiver in Washington) and 1962 first-round draft choice Leroy Jackson of Western Illinois. The move was made under unfortunate circumstances – as it turned out that Davis had leukemia, and died without ever playing a down in professional football. The Redskins ended the 1962 season with their best record in five years:  Mitchell led the league with 11 touchdowns, and caught 72 passes and was selected to the Pro Bowl. In time, Mitchell would be joined by other black players like receiver Charley Taylor, running back Larry Brown, defensive back Brig Owens, and guard John Nisby from the Pittsburgh Steelers.

Jack Kent Cooke era (1969–1998) 
In 1969, the Redskins hired Vince Lombardi, who had gained fame coaching with the Green Bay Packers, to be their new head coach. Lombardi led the team to a  their best since 1955, but died of cancer on the eve of the 1970 season. Assistant coach Bill Austin was the interim head coach in 1970, and Washington finished

George Allen years (1971–1977) 

After the death of Lombardi and Austin's unsuccessful 1970 season, Williams signed former Los Angeles Rams head coach George Allen as head coach on January 6, 1971. Partial to seasoned veterans instead of highly touted young players, Allen's teams became known as the Over-the-Hill Gang. That season, the Redskins made the playoffs for the first time since 1945 with a 9–4–1 mark with Redskins first-year head coach George Allen winning the 1971 NFL Coach of the Year Award, the second of his career, winning his first Coach of the Year Award in 1967 as the head coach of the Rams. However, they lost in the Divisional Playoffs to the San Francisco 49ers, 24–20. The following season, the Redskins hosted their first post-season game in Washington since 1942, where they beat the Green Bay Packers 16–3 in the NFC Divisional Playoffs. The Redskins reached the NFC Championship Game, and in a much-anticipated match-up against the archrival Dallas Cowboys, the Redskins would not disappoint. The Redskins placekicker Curt Knight kicked an 18-yard field goal in the second quarter to get the scoring underway, then Redskins quarterback Billy Kilmer connected with Redskins wide receiver Charley Taylor on a 15-yard touchdown pass and Washington had a 10–3 lead at halftime. In the fourth quarter, Kilmer again went to Taylor, this time for a 45-yard touchdown. Knight added three more field goals that period and The Over-The-Hill-Gang defense allowed only a second-quarter field goal. The final score was Washington 26, Dallas 3. After defeating the Dallas Cowboys to win the NFC Championship, the Redskins went on to lose to the undefeated Miami Dolphins 14–7 in Super Bowl VII. Redskins running back Larry Brown would be named the 1972 NFL's Most Valuable Player.

The Redskins again made the playoffs in 1973, 1974, and 1976, only to lose all three times in the first round. After his Redskins failed to make the playoffs in 1977 despite posting a 9–5 record, Allen was fired and was replaced by new head coach Jack Pardee, a star linebacker under Allen in Los Angeles and Washington. In his first year, his team started 6–0 but then lost 8 of the last 10 games. Then in the offseason, Redskins majority owner Jack Kent Cooke moved from Los Angeles to Virginia and took over the team's day-by-day operations from Edward Bennett Williams.

The Redskins chose well during the 1979 NFL Draft, where they drafted future stars Don Warren and Monte Coleman. They opened the 1979 season 6–2 and were 10–5 heading into the season finale at Texas Stadium, against whom a win would assure a playoff spot and a possible NFC East title. Washington led 34–28 with time running out, but quarterback Roger Staubach then led the Cowboys in a fourth-quarter comeback with two touchdown passes. The 35–34 loss knocked the 10–6 Redskins out of playoff contention. Pardee's quick success with the team did not go unnoticed, however, and he was named Associated Press Coach of the Year and UPI NFC Coach of the Year. Pardee's tenure did not last long though, for he was fired after posting a 6–10 record in 1980. He did, however, draft Art Monk in the first round.

Joe Gibbs years (1981–1992) 
On January 13, 1981, owner Jack Kent Cooke signed the offensive coordinator of the San Diego Chargers, Joe Gibbs, as their head coach. Also during the off-season, the Redskins acquired Mark May, Russ Grimm, and Dexter Manley in the 1981 NFL Draft, all of whom became significant contributors to the team for the next few years. After starting the 1981 season 0–5, the Redskins won eight out of their next 11 games and finished the season 8–8.

Super Bowl XVII champions (1982) 

Starting on September 21, 1982, the NFL faced a 57-day long players' strike, which reduced the 1982 season from a 16-game schedule to a nine-game schedule. Because of the shortened season, the NFL adopted a special 16-team playoff tournament, in which eight teams from each conference were seeded 1–8 based on their regular season records. After the strike was settled, the Redskins dominated, winning six out of the seven remaining games to make the playoffs for the first time since 1976.

In January 1983, during the second round of the playoffs against the Minnesota Vikings, John Riggins rushed for a Redskins playoff record 185 yards, leading Washington to a 21–7 win. The game is perhaps best known for a moment when the stadium physically shook as a crowd chanted "We Want Dallas!", which later became a rallying cry of sorts for Redskin fans before games against the Cowboys. In the NFC Championship Game against them at Robert F. Kennedy Memorial Stadium, Redskins defensive end Dexter Manley knocked Cowboys' quarterback Danny White out for the rest of the game and sent him into the locker room shortly before halftime. Later in the game, Redskins defensive tackle Darryl Grant's interception, which he returned for a 10-yard touchdown, off one of Cowboys' backup quarterback Gary Hogeboom's passes which was tipped by Dexter Manley to score the decisive points. John Riggins rushed for 140 yards and two touchdowns on 36 carries and the Redskins went on to defeat the Cowboys' by a score of 31–17. The Redskins' first Super Bowl win, and their first NFL Championship in 40 years, was in Super Bowl XVII, where the Redskins defeated the Miami Dolphins 27–17. Riggins provided the game's signature play when, on 4th and inches, with the Redskins down 17–13, the coaches called "70 Chip", a play designed for short yardage. Riggins instead gained  by running through would-be tackler Don McNeal and getting the go-ahead touchdown. The Redskins ended up winning by a 27–17 score with John Riggins winning the Super Bowl MVP.

After the 1982 season Redskins placekicker Mark Moseley was the first and only placekicker in NFL history to be named the NFL's Most Valuable Player; Moseley made 20 of 21 field goals attempted in 1982. Redskins head coach Joe Gibbs also won his first NFL Coach of the Year Award in 1982 which was the first of his back-to-back NFL Coach of the Year Awards, his second coming in the 1983 NFL season.

The 1983 season marked the rookie debut of cornerback Darrell Green, selected in the 1983 NFL Draft along with Charles Mann, Green would go on to play his entire 20-year NFL career for the Redskins. Then during the regular-season finale on December 17, 1983, Moseley set an NFL scoring record with 161 points while Riggins' total of 144 points was second. This marked the first time since 1951 that the top two scorers in a season played on the same team. They dominated the NFL with a 14-win season which included scoring a then NFL record 541 points, many of which came from Riggins, who scored 24 touchdowns. Redskins quarterback Joe Theismann would also be named the 1983 NFL's Most Valuable Player finishing the season with a career-high in both yards passing 3,714 yds., and touchdown passes thrown, 29 Td's while throwing only 11 interceptions. In the postseason, the Redskins beat the Los Angeles Rams 51–7. The next week, Washington beat the San Francisco 49ers 24–21 in the NFC Championship Game. It was their final win of the season because two weeks later, the Raiders beat the Redskins 38–9 in Super Bowl XVIII.

The Redskins finished the 1984 season with an 11–5 record, and won the NFC East for the third consecutive season. However, they lost in the first round of the playoffs to the Chicago Bears, 23–19. On November 18, 1985, while playing against the Giants, Theismann broke his leg during a sack by Lawrence Taylor. The compound fracture forced him to retire after a 12-year career, during which he became the Redskins' all-time leader in pass attempts and completions. The Redskins finished 3rd in the NFC East behind the Cowboys and missed the wild card to the Giants by virtue of tiebreakers.

The 1986 offseason's major highlight occurred during the 1986 NFL Draft, when the Redskins picked up future Super Bowl MVP Mark Rypien in the sixth round, also the Redskins defensive end Dexter Manley set a franchise single-season record when he recorded 18.5 sacks while earning 1st Team All-Pro honors and being selected to the Pro bowl. In 1986 season, the road to the playoffs was even harder, with the Redskins making the postseason as a wild-card team despite having a regular-season record of 12–4. They won the Wild Card playoff against the Rams, and then again in the Divisional playoffs against the Bears. This game was Gibbs's 70th career, which made him the winningest head coach in Redskins history. The season ended next week, however, when the Redskins lost to the eventual Super Bowl XXI Champion Giants 17–0 in the NFC Championship game.

Super Bowl XXII champions (1987) 

The 1987 season began with a 24-day players' strike, reducing the 16-game season to 15. The games for weeks 4–6 were won with all replacement players. The Redskins have the distinction of being the only team with no players crossing the picket line. Those three victories are often credited with getting the team into the playoffs and the basis for the 2000 movie The Replacements. The Redskins won their second championship in Super Bowl XXII on January 31, 1988, in San Diego, California. The Redskins routed the Denver Broncos 42–10 after starting the game in a 10–0 deficit, the largest come-from-behind victory in Super Bowl history, which was tied by the New Orleans Saints in Super Bowl XLIV and the New England Patriots in Super Bowl XLIX. This game is more famous for the stellar performance by quarterback Doug Williams who passed for four touchdowns in the second quarter en route to becoming the first black quarterback to lead his team to a Super Bowl victory while also winning the games Super Bowl MVP award. Rookie running back Timmy Smith had a great performance as well, running for a Super Bowl record .

1988 started off with a boom and the club had a 5–3 record at mid-season, but a 2nd half swoon saw them miss the playoffs with a 7–9 record.

The 1989 Redskins finished with a 10–6 record but missed the playoffs. That season is best remembered for the Redskins prolific wide receiver trio nicknamed "The Posse" consisting of wide receivers Art Monk, Gary Clark, and Ricky Sanders who became the first trio of wide receivers in NFL history to post 1,000-plus yards in the same season. Also, in a week-14 victory against the San Diego Chargers, Redskins head coach Joe Gibbs achieved his 100th career victory. 100. The Redskins returned to the playoffs in 1990 as a Wild Card team, but lost in the Divisional round to the 49ers.

Super Bowl XXVI champions (1991) 
The 1991 season started with a franchise-record 11 straight victories. Also during the season, "The Hogs", under the coaching of Redskins offensive line coach Joe Bugel, allowed a league-low and franchise-record nine sacks – the third-lowest total in NFL history. The 1991 Redskins offense also dominated under the brilliant coaching of offensive-minded head football coach Joe Gibbs, scoring 485 points which was the most by any team in the 1991 NFL season. The 1991 Redskins defense was also dominant under the coaching of defensive coordinator and guru Richie Petitbon, giving up only 224 total points which was second-best of any team in the NFL in 1991, while also not allowing a single point to opponents in 3 of the 16 games played that season. After posting a 14–2 record, the Redskins made and dominated the playoffs, beating the Falcons and Lions by a combined score of 64–17. On January 26, 1992, the Redskins won Super Bowl XXVI by defeating the Buffalo Bills 37–24 with Mark Rypien winning the games Super Bowl MVP award. After the Super Bowl, the Redskins set another franchise record by sending eight players to the Pro Bowl. The 1991 Washington Redskins are widely considered one of the best teams in NFL history.

The Redskins success in 1992 culminated in a trip to the playoffs as a wild card team, but they lost in the Divisional playoffs to the 49ers, 20–13. The most impressive feat during the season occurred on October 12, 1992, when Art Monk became the NFL's all-time leading pass receiver against the Denver Broncos on Monday Night Football by catching his 820th career reception. The era ended on March 5, 1993, when Joe Gibbs retired after 12 years of coaching with the Redskins. In what proved to be a temporary retirement, Gibbs pursued an interest in NASCAR by founding Joe Gibbs Racing.

After the end of Gibbs' first tenure, the Redskins hired former Redskins player Richie Petitbon for the 1993 season. However, his first and only year as head coach, the Redskins finished with a record of 4–12. Petitbon was fired at the end of the season and on February 2, 1994, Norv Turner was hired as head coach after being the offensive coordinator of the Dallas Cowboys. 1994 was even worse as they finished 3–13, their worst season in over 30 years. Their sole bright spot that year came on October 9, 1994, linebacker Monte Coleman played in his 206th career game with the Redskins, which broke Art Monk's team record for games played (Coleman retired at season's end with 216 games played). They improved to 6–10 in 1995 where they were able to get a season sweep on the eventual Super Bowl XXX Champions the Dallas Cowboys. On March 13, 1996, Redskins owner Jack Kent Cooke, Maryland Governor Parris Glendening, and Prince George's County Executive Wayne K. Curry signed a contract that paved the way for the immediate start of construction for the new home of the Redskins (now FedExField). The 1996 season saw Washington post their first winning record in 4 years by finishing 9–7. On December 22, 1996, the Redskins played their final game at Robert F. Kennedy Memorial Stadium, a victory over the Dallas Cowboys 37–10, and finished their tenure at the stadium with a 173–102–3 record, including 11–1 in the playoffs.

On April 6, 1997, Redskins owner Jack Kent Cooke died of congestive heart failure at the age of 84. In his will, Cooke left the Redskins to the Jack Kent Cooke Foundation, with instructions that the foundation sell the team. His estate, headed by son John Kent Cooke, took over ownership of the Redskins and at his memorial service, John Kent Cooke announced that the new stadium in Landover, Maryland, would be named Jack Kent Cooke Stadium. On September 14, 1997, the Redskins played in their new stadium for the first time and beat the Arizona Cardinals, 19–13 in overtime. On November 23, 1997, they played the New York Giants and the result was a 7–7 tie, the Redskins first tie game since the 1971 season. They would finish 1997 8–7–1 and would miss the playoffs for the fifth season in a row. One bright spot during the season, however, occurred on December 13, 1997, when Darrell Green played in his 217th career game as a Redskin, breaking Monte Coleman's record for games played.

The 1998 season started with a seven-game losing streak, and the Redskins finished with a 6–10 record.

Daniel Snyder era (1999–present)

After two seasons, John Kent Cooke was unable to raise sufficient funds to permanently purchase the Redskins, and on May 25, 1999, Daniel Snyder gained unanimous approval (31–0) from league owners and bought the franchise for $800 million, a deal that was the most expensive team-purchasing deal in sporting history. One of his first acts as team owner occurred on November 21, 1999, when he sold the naming-rights to Jack Kent Cooke Stadium to the highest bidder, FedEx, who renamed the stadium FedExField.

In Snyder's first season as owner, the Redskins went 10–6, including a four-game winning streak early in the season, and made it to the playoffs for the first time in Norv Turner's career (and the first time for the Redskins since 1992) in the final game of the season (on January 2, 2000, against the Dolphins). Running back Stephen Davis rushed for a then club-record 1,405 yards and quarterback Brad Johnson completed a then club-record 316 passes and threw for more than 4,000 yards in regular play that season. They then defeated the Detroit Lions in the first round of the playoffs, but lost to the Buccaneers, 14–13.

The 2000 season started with the selection of future Pro Bowler Chris Samuels and the tumultuous LaVar Arrington in the 2000 NFL Draft and included five consecutive wins in the first half of the season. However, they ended up going 7–6 with Turner being fired as head coach prior to the end of the season. Terry Robiskie was named interim coach to finish out the season, which ended with an 8–8 record. During the final game of the season, Larry Centers became the NFL's all-time leader in receptions by a running back with 685.

On January 3, 2001, the Redskins hired former Cleveland Browns and Kansas City Chiefs head coach Marty Schottenheimer as head coach. The 2001 season began with a loss to the San Diego Chargers, 30–3, two days before the September 11, 2001, attacks. On September 13, 2001, the Redskins announced the establishment of the Redskins Relief Fund to help families of the victims of the attack at the Pentagon. During the course of the season, the Redskins raised more than $700,000. They finished the season with an 8–8 record and Schottenheimer was fired after the final game. Snyder later said in a 2013 interview that he was fired due to his over-controlling nature.

On January 14, 2002, Snyder hired University of Florida coach Steve Spurrier, the Redskins' fifth new head coach in 10 years. They finished with a 7–9 record, their first losing season in four years. A bittersweet moment during the season occurred on December 29, when Darrell Green concluded his 20th and final season as the Redskins defeated the Cowboys 20–14 at FedExField. During his 20 seasons, he set an NFL record for consecutive seasons with at least one interception (19) and a Redskins team record for regular-season games played (295) and started (258). The Redskins finished the 2003 season with a 5–11 record, their worst since 1994. The one bright note of the season was on December 7, when defensive end Bruce Smith sacked Giants quarterback Jesse Palmer in the fourth quarter. With his 199th career sack, Smith broke Reggie White's all-time NFL mark. After two mediocre years, Spurrier resigned after the 2003 season with three years left on his contract.

For the 2004 season, Snyder successfully lured former coach Joe Gibbs away from NASCAR to return as head coach and team president. His employment came with a promise of decreased intervention in football operations from Snyder. Snyder also expanded FedExField to a league-high capacity of 91,665 seats. Gibbs' return to the franchise did not pay instant dividends as the Redskins finished the 2004 season with a record of 6–10. Despite an impressive defense, the team struggled offensively. Quarterback Mark Brunell—an off-season acquisition from the Jacksonville Jaguars—struggled in his first season, and was replaced midway through the season by backup Patrick Ramsey. On the other hand, some of Gibbs' other new signings, such as cornerback Shawn Springs and linebacker Marcus Washington, did very well. The Redskins also picked Sean Taylor from University of Miami during the draft in Gibbs' first season.

The 2005 season started with three wins, including win on September 19 against the Dallas Cowboys. Dallas led 13–0 with less than four minutes left when Brunell threw a  touchdown pass to Moss on a fourth-down play. Then, with 2:44 left, Brunell connected with Moss again on a  touchdown pass and Nick Novak kicked the game-winning extra point. It was the Redskins' first victory at Texas Stadium since 1995. They then fell into a slump, losing six of the next eight games which included three straight losses in November, and their playoff chances looked bleak. On December 18, 2005, the Redskins beat Cowboys, 35–7, which marked the first time since 1995 that the Redskins swept the season series with Dallas. The Redskins clinched their first playoff berth since 1999. The game also culminated impressive season performances by individuals. Also, Chris Cooley's 71 receptions broke Jerry Smith's season record for a Redskins tight end. In the first round of the playoffs, the Redskins met the Buccaneers. The Redskins won 17–10, after taking an early 14–0 lead, which they thought they lost until replay showed that a touchdown, which would have tied the game, was an incomplete pass. In that game, the Redskins broke the record for fewest offensive yards (120) gained in a playoff victory, with one of their two touchdowns being from a defensive run after a fumble recovery. The following weekend, they played the Seahawks, who defeated the Redskins 20–10, ending their hopes of reaching their first NFC Championship Game since 1991.

The first major move of the 2006 off-season was the hiring of Kansas City Chiefs' offensive coordinator Al Saunders as offensive coordinator. Gibbs also added former Buffalo Bills defensive coordinator Jerry Gray to his staff as secondary/cornerbacks coach and lost quarterbacks coach Bill Musgrave to the Falcons. The Redskins also picked up future starters Rocky McIntosh, Anthony Montgomery, Reed Doughty, and Kedric Golston in the 2006 NFL Draft. After winning only three of the first nine games, Gibbs benched quarterback Brunell for former first-round draft pick Jason Campbell. After losing his first game as a starter to Tampa Bay, Campbell got his first NFL victory against the Carolina Panthers, bringing the Redskins out of a three-game losing streak. The highlight of the season happened on November 5, and concluded with one of the most exciting endings in the history of the Cowboys–Redskins rivalry. Tied 19–19, Troy Vincent blocked a last-second field goal attempt by Dallas that would have given them the win. Sean Taylor picked up the ball and ran , breaking tackles along the way. It was thought that the game would then go in overtime, however because of a defensive  face mask penalty, the Redskins would get an untimed down. Novak kicked a  field goal, giving Washington a 22–19 victory. However, the Redskins finished the year with a 5–11 record, which resulted in them being last in the NFC East. This marked the second losing season of Joe Gibbs' second term as head coach with the Redskins, compared to the one losing season he had in his first 12-year tenure as head coach.

The Redskins began the 2007 season by "winning ugly" starting the season off 2–0. The Redskins kept winning and losing close games, the only exception to this a 34–3 rout of the Detroit Lions. The Redskins continued to win ugly and lose ugly to be 5–3 at the halfway mark. However, the Redskins would begin to collapse. The team lost their next three games to fall to 5–6. On Monday, November 26, Redskins safety Sean Taylor was shot by home intruders early in the morning in his Miami home. The next morning, Taylor died from severe blood loss. However, the Redskins rebounded to finish 9–7 and clinch the final playoff spot in the NFC. Washington trailed 13–0 entering the 4th quarter to the Seattle Seahawks in the Wild Card round, but rallied to take a 14–13 lead, but Redskins kicker Shaun Suisham missed a field goal later in the game, and the Seahawks scored on the next drive and converted the two-point conversion. To close the game, Todd Collins threw two interceptions, each returned for a touchdown, and the Redskins fell 35–14.

After Joe Gibbs announced his retirement following the 2007 season, Jim Zorn was hired as head coach, and brought in a West Coast Offense. The 2008 season started well, as the Redskins started the season 6–2. Furthermore, Redskins RB Clinton Portis led the NFL in rushing yards. However, things turned for the worse in early November, when they were routed 23–6 by the Pittsburgh Steelers and Portis' injuries finally caught up to him. The Redskins continued to struggle, falling all the way to 7–7, with their only win during that six-week period being a 3-point victory of the then-2–8 Seattle Seahawks. The Redskins managed to upset the Philadelphia Eagles in Week 16, but were eliminated from playoff contention. The team's fortunes continued to slide in 2009, as they finished 4–12. Zorn was fired and replaced by Mike Shanahan after the season.

On April 4, the Redskins acquired Donovan McNabb in a trade from the rival Philadelphia Eagles. However, the Redskins struggled to a 6–10 finish, once again 4th place in the division. The McNabb era came to an abrupt end when he was traded to Minnesota in August 2011. The troublesome  After cutting the injury-rattled Clinton Portis, the Redskins had no important offensive players left except for Santana Moss. Mike Shanahan surprised most observers by his decision to name John Beck, an obscure free-agent quarterback, as the starter. However, Shanahan suddenly reversed direction by naming veteran backup Rex Grossman to the starting position. In Week 1, Grossman threw for 305 yards and two touchdown passes as the Redskins crushed the Giants 28–14, ending a six-game losing streak against that team. The Washington Redskins started the season 2–0, but then struggled to a 5–11 finish, however, they managed to win both meetings over the eventual Super Bowl champion New York Giants.

In 2012, the Redskins traded several high draft picks to the St. Louis Rams in order to take Baylor quarterback Robert Griffin III second overall in the 2012 NFL Draft. Although the need for a franchise quarterback was obvious, many journalists had doubts about the value of giving up a lot for a single player. In the opening game of the season, Griffin threw for 320 yards and two touchdown passes in a 40–32 victory over the New Orleans Saints to give the team its highest-scoring game since 2005. The Redskins struggled to a 3–6 start, but in Week 11, the Redskins would host the struggling Philadelphia Eagles. Griffin would have one of the best games of his career to date, as the Redskins won 31–6 with long touchdowns to Santana Moss and Aldrick Robinson. The Redskins would win their next 6 games after that, including the crucial final game of the season against the Cowboys, which would clinch the division for and send the Redskins to the playoffs. The Redskins hosted the Seattle Seahawks in the Wild Card round but lost 24–14.

Hopes were high for a repeat division title in 2013. However, these hopes were in vain, as poor play and controversy stirred during the entire year, leading to a disastrous 3–13 campaign. Even though most players had a down year compared to 2012, Pierre Garçon had his greatest season statistically yet. Garcon broke Art Monk's 29-year-old franchise record for catches in a single season. Garcon had 113 catches total, which broke Monk's 106 catches in 1984 by seven. The Redskins fired Shanahan and most of his staff after the season.

On January 9, 2014, the Redskins hired Jay Gruden as their head coach. Gruden became the eighth head coach of the team since Daniel Snyder purchased the franchise in 1999. The Redskins struggled throughout the season, having three different quarterbacks start games, amounting to a 4–12 record. Defense coordinator Jim Haslett was fired at the end of the season.

On January 7, 2015, the Redskins hired Scot McCloughan to be their general manager. McCloughan took over control of the roster from Bruce Allen, who was given the sole title of team president after the hiring. In October 2015, the Redskins had their largest comeback win in franchise history, coming back to win against the Tampa Bay Buccaneers 31–30 after being down 0–24 in the second quarter. The Redskins clinched the NFC East division title on December 26, when they beat the Philadelphia Eagles in Week 16, 38–24. The division title was their third since Snyder took over ownership of the team, and was the first since the 1999 season to be clinched before Week 17. The Redskins hosted the Green Bay Packers in the Wild Card round on January 10, 2016, but lost 35–18, ending their 2015 season. Kirk Cousins, who took over as starting quarterback in the preseason, finished the season with career highs in touchdowns (29), yards (4,166), and completion percentage (69.8%). His completion percentage led the league, while his 29 touchdowns tied him for second on the franchise single-season list.

The team's offense in 2016 set several franchise records, including having over 6,000 total net yards, which was only the third time in franchise history the team had accomplished that. Quarterback Kirk Cousins also set single-season team records in attempts, completions, and passing yards, breaking many of his records he had previously set in 2015. DeSean Jackson, Pierre Garçon, Jamison Crowder, Robert Kelley, Chris Thompson, Jordan Reed, Vernon Davis, and Matt Jones all finished the season with at least 500 yards from scrimmage, tying the 2011 New Orleans Saints for the most in a single season in NFL history. Despite the numerous records set, the Redskins missed the playoffs, losing 19–10 in a "win and in" situation against the New York Giants in the final week of the season. However, the Redskins still finished the season with a record of 8–7–1, giving the team their first consecutive winning seasons in nearly 20 years. In contrast with the record setting offense, the team's defense had a poor season, finishing 29 out of 32 teams in total defense, which led to the firing of defensive coordinator Joe Barry, as well as three of his assistants. In 2017, Cousins had his third straight season with 4,000 passing yards while once again playing under the franchise tag. For the second straight season, the Redskins missed the playoffs, finishing 7–9.

During the 2018 offseason, the Redskins traded for quarterback Alex Smith to replace Kirk Cousins as he left for the Minnesota Vikings in free agency. Despite early success starting the season 6–3, their best start since 2008, the team finished the season 1–6 due to injuries. In a game against the Houston Texans on November 18, 2018, Alex Smith suffered a compound and spiral fracture to his tibia and fibula in his right leg when he was sacked by Kareem Jackson and J. J. Watt which forced him to miss the rest of the season. This led to Colt McCoy, Mark Sanchez, and Josh Johnson starting games in the second half of the season. The team finished at 7–9 and missed the playoffs for the third consecutive year, with a league-high 25 players on injured reserve.

Due to Smith's injury, the Redskins acquired Case Keenum from the Denver Broncos in the 2019 offseason, and drafted Dwayne Haskins from Ohio State in the 2019 NFL Draft. With a league worst 0–5 start to the season, tying with the Cincinnati Bengals, and their worst start since 2001, the Redskins fired Gruden on October 7, 2019, with offensive line coach Bill Callahan serving as the interim head coach for the rest of the season. Gruden finished as the longest-tenured head coach in the Snyder era with six seasons, a 35–49–1 regular season record and one playoff appearance. The Redskins finished the season at 3–13, with victories over the Detroit Lions and Carolina Panthers, and missed the playoffs for the fourth straight year. The record was their worst since going 3–13 in 2013 and was the second worst of any team that season, behind only the Bengals at 2–14.

Rebranding (2020) 

The team underwent several changes in 2020, including retiring the Redskins name and logo and hiring former Carolina Panthers head coach Ron Rivera in the same role, as well as naming Jason Wright as team president, the first black person named to that position in NFL history. Some notable members of Rivera's staff include former Jacksonville Jaguars and Oakland Raiders head coach Jack Del Rio as defensive coordinator and Scott Turner, the son of former Redskins head coach Norv Turner, as offensive coordinator.

Under Rivera and Del Rio, the team switched their defensive scheme from a 3–4 defense, which the team had used under both Shanahan and Gruden's tenure, to a 4–3 defense. Due to their 3–13 record the previous season, the team had the second overall pick in the 2020 NFL Draft and selected Chase Young, who would go on to be named Defensive Rookie of the Year. Dwayne Haskins, the team's first-round draft pick from 2019, was released prior to the season's end due to ineffective play and not meeting the team's standards off the field. Despite that, Washington would eventually win the division for the first time since 2015 at 7–9, becoming only the third team in NFL history to win a division with a losing record in a non-strike year after the 2010 Seattle Seahawks and 2014 Carolina Panthers, the latter of which Rivera also coached.

Earlier in 2020, minority owners Robert Rothman, Dwight Schar, and Frederick W. Smith were reported to have hired an investment banking firm to help search for potential buyers for their stake in the team, worth around 40 percent combined. The group, who bought their stake in 2003, were reported to have urged Snyder to change the name for years. In April 2021, Snyder was approved by the league for a debt waiver of $400 million to acquire the remaining 40 percent in a deal worth over $800 million.

Some other additions and changes in 2021 included the team hiring Martin Mayhew as general manager and Marty Hurney as another high-ranking executive. With the hiring of Mayhew, who is Black, Washington became the first team in NFL history to concurrently have a minority general manager, head coach, and president. Ryan Kerrigan, the franchise's all-time leader in sacks, left the team as a free agent to sign with the division rival Philadelphia Eagles. 

A year-long independent investigation into the team's workplace culture under owner Daniel Snyder, led by lawyer Beth Wilkinson, was concluded in July 2021. It found that several incidents of sexual harassment, bullying, and intimidation were commonplace throughout the organization under his ownership. The NFL fined the team $10 million in response, with Snyder also voluntarily stepping down from running the team's day-to-day operations for a few months, giving those responsibilities to his wife Tanya. Snyder would later be investigated by the United States House Committee on Oversight and Reform for those claims as well as accusations of financial improprieties.

The team rebranded as the Commanders in 2022 and continued to see cultural changes within the organization. With the rebrand, their fight song returned with revised lyrics as "Hail to the Commanders", while their longtime cheerleading squad was replaced by a co-ed performance group known as the Command Force. The year also saw the team trade for Colts quarterback Carson Wentz.

Redskins name and logo controversy

The team's former Redskins branding, used from 1933 until 2020, was one of the leading examples of the Native American mascot controversy as the term redskin has been defined as offensive, disparaging, and taboo. Various people and groups, such as the National Congress of American Indians (NCAI), considered the name a racial slur and attempted to get the team to change it for decades. Supporters of the name countered both the dictionary definition of the term and the testimony of Native Americans by asserting that their use of the name was intended respectfully, and referred only to the football team and its history.

In a 2013 letter "To the Washington Redskins Nation", team owner Daniel Snyder stated that while respecting those that say they are offended, a poll conducted by the Annenberg Public Policy Center in 2004 found that 90% of Native Americans were not offended by the name and logo. This poll was essentially replicated in 2016 by The Washington Post with nearly identical results. However, public opinion polling, which places the question about the Redskins within a longer telephone survey on other topics, was deemed scientifically questionable by academic researchers. As an alternative, social scientists from the University of Michigan and University of California at Berkeley performed a study in 2020 that measured Native American opinion in detail, finding that 49% had responded that the name was offensive, with the level of offense increasing to 67% for those with a stronger involvement in Native American culture.

In 2014 when the franchise was entangled in a legal trademark protection case, the Washington Post announced their editorials would no longer use the "Redskins" name, and subsequently other news outlets would informally call them by their geographically related area such as "the Washington pro football team" or avoid publishing their nickname, altogether. ESPN updated their employee work policies to allow their reporters to choose how to refer to the team going forward.

Following renewed attention to questions of racial justice in the wake of the murder of George Floyd and the subsequent protests in 2020, a letter signed by 87 shareholders and investors was sent to team and league sponsors Nike, FedEx, and PepsiCo urging them to cut their ties unless the name was changed. Around the same time, several retail companies began removing Redskins merchandise from their stores. In response, the team underwent a review in July 2020 and announced that it would retire its name. The team played as the Washington Football Team until rebranding as the Commanders in 2022, featuring a new logo and uniforms.

Logos and uniforms

The franchise's primary colors are burgundy and gold. From 1961 through 1978, Washington wore gold pants with both the burgundy and white jerseys, although details of the jerseys and pants changed a few times during this period. Gold face masks were introduced in 1978 and remain as such to this day; previous to that they were grey. Throughout most of the 1980s, 1990s, and 2000s, Washington was just one of three other teams that primarily wore their white jerseys at home (the others being the Dallas Cowboys and Miami Dolphins). The tradition of wearing white jerseys over burgundy pants at home, which is considered the "classic" look, was started by Joe Gibbs when he took over as coach in 1981. Gibbs was an assistant for the San Diego Chargers in 1979 and 1980 when the team wore white at home under head coach Don Coryell.

Their burgundy jerseys were primarily used only when the opposing team decided to wear white at home, which came mostly against the Dallas Cowboys and was normally worn over white pants. It was worn on the road against other teams that prefer to wear white at home for games occurring early in the season. From 1981 through 2000, Washington wore their white jerseys over burgundy pants at home almost exclusively. In 1994, as part of a league-wide celebration of the NFL's 75th anniversary, during certain games, the team wore special uniforms which emulated the uniforms worn by the team in its inaugural season in Washington in 1937. Both worn over gold pants, the burgundy jerseys featured gold numbers bordered in white and the white jerseys featured burgundy numbers bordered in gold. The most distinctive feature of both colors of the jersey was the patches worn on both sleeves, which were a reproduction of the patches worn on the full-length sleeves of the 1937 jerseys. Worn with these uniforms was a plain burgundy helmet with a gold facemask.

In 2001, the team wore burgundy for all home games in the preseason and regular season per a decision by Marty Schottenheimer, their coach for that year. In 2002, the team celebrated the passing of 70 years since its creation as the Boston Braves in 1932 and wore a special home uniform, a burgundy jersey over gold pants, which roughly resembled the home uniforms used from 1969 to 1978. The helmets used with this special home uniform during that year were a reproduction of the helmets used by the team from 1965 to 1969, though they wore white at home in Week 1 against the Arizona Cardinals and again in Week 17, the latter forcing the Cowboys to use their blue jerseys. This special home uniform was also worn during one game in 2003. In 2004, when Gibbs became the coach of the team once again, the team switched back to wearing white jerseys at home; in Gibbs's 16 years as head coach, the team never wore burgundy jerseys at home, even wearing a white throwback jersey in 2007.

Their white jerseys have provided three basic color combinations. The last combination consists of both white jerseys and pants. That particular combination surfaced in the first game of the 2003 season when the team was coached by Steve Spurrier, during a nationally televised game against the New York Jets, which led many sports fans and Redskins faithful alike to point out that they had never seen that particular combination before. The Redskins won six straight games, including one in the playoffs against the Tampa Bay Buccaneers, wearing that combination. In the NFC Divisional Playoff game against the eventual 2005 NFC Champion Seattle Seahawks, Washington wore the all-white uniforms in hopes that they could keep their streak going; however, they lost 20–10. The white jersey over burgundy pants look reappeared in a home game against the Carolina Panthers later in 2006.

In celebration of the franchise's 75th anniversary, Washington wore a one-time throwback uniform for a home game against the New York Giants, based on their away uniform from 1970 to 1971. Players wore a white jersey with three burgundy and two gold stripes on each sleeve and the 75th-anniversary logo on the left chest. The pants were gold, with one white stripe bordered by a burgundy stripe on each side, running down each side. The helmet was gold-colored with a burgundy "R" logo. The helmet and uniform styles were the same as the ones the franchise used during the 1970–71 seasons. Vince Lombardi, who coached Washington in 1969 before dying during the 1970 preseason, was the inspiration behind the helmet. Lombardi pushed for the logo, which sat inside a white circle enclosed within a burgundy circle border, with Native American feathers hanging down from the side because of its similarity to the "G" on the helmets worn by the Green Bay Packers, who he had coached during most of the 1960s.

In a 2008 Monday Night Football game against the against the Pittsburgh Steelers, Washington wore a monochrome look by wearing burgundy jerseys over burgundy pants. This combination made two further appearances the following season against the Dallas Cowboys and New York Giants. The Redskins, starting in 2010, began to wear the burgundy jersey paired with the gold pants reminiscent of the George Allen era. Against the Tennessee Titans later that season, the team matched the gold pants with the usual white jerseys for the first time. Washington wore the same combination against the Giants on the road two weeks later.

In 2011, the Redskins wore the burgundy jersey and gold pants for five home games and a road game at Dallas, the burgundy jersey with white pants for three home games and a road game at Miami, the white jersey and burgundy pants for five road games, and the white jersey and gold pants for a Bills game in Toronto. The following year, the team wore an updated throwback uniform of the 1937 championship team that featured a helmet pattern based on the logo-less leather helmets worn at the time, in a game against the Carolina Panthers. In 2013, a newly implemented NFL rule stated that teams could not wear alternate helmets (thus limiting them to one helmet) on account of player safety. As a result, Washington wore its 1937 throwbacks with the logo removed from the regular helmet in a game versus the San Diego Chargers. That year, the Redskins removed the burgundy collar from their white jerseys in order to have better consistency with the new Nike uniforms that had debuted the previous season.

Between 2014 and 2016, the team wore the gold pants with their standard uniforms, although the burgundy pants returned as part of the team's away uniform later in 2016. In 2017, Washington resurrected the all-burgundy ensemble as part of the NFL Color Rush. Nike initially provided an all-gold uniform but team officials called it "garish" and refused to wear it. In 2018, Washington replaced the gold pants with white for the majority of their home games. Following the franchise's name change to the Washington Football Team in 2020, their new logo was a simple "W" taken from the redesigned Washington wordmark while the helmet logo and striping were replaced with the player's jersey number in gold. The season also saw the return of the all-white combination for the first time since 2009.

The Commanders rebranding in 2022 included new logos and uniforms featuring military-inspired motifs. The primary home uniform remained burgundy with gold and white stripes with the letters having a gold base. The team name is placed atop the numbers in front, which were also gold and trimmed in white. The road white uniform features burgundy and white gradient numbers with black trim, along with burgundy and white gradient and black sleeve stripes. Both sets are paired with either burgundy or white pants. The alternate black uniform features the team name on the left chest in gold, and numbers have a gold base with burgundy trim. Black pants are paired with this uniform with an alternate black helmet having with the "W" logo in front and uniform numbers on each side. A pig mascot, Major Tuddy, was also unvieled by the end of the season.

Rivalries

Dallas Cowboys

The Commanders' rivalry with the Dallas Cowboys features two teams that have won 31 combined division titles and 10 championships, including eight combined Super Bowls. The rivalry started in 1960 when the Cowboys joined the league as an expansion team. During that year they were in separate conferences, but played once during the season. In 1961, Dallas was placed in the same division as the Redskins, and from that point on, they have played each other twice during every regular season.

Texas oil tycoon Clint Murchison Jr. was having a difficult time bringing an NFL team to Dallas. In 1958, Murchison heard that George Preston Marshall, owner of the Washington Redskins, was eager to sell the team. Just as the sale was about to be finalized, Marshall called for a change in terms. Murchison was outraged and canceled the whole deal. Around this time, Marshall had a falling out with the Redskin band director, Barnee Breeskin. Breeskin had written the music for the team's fight song, now known as "Hail to the Commanders", which gets played by the Washington Commanders Marching Band after every touchdown at home games. He wanted revenge after the failed negotiations with Marshall. He approached Tom Webb, Murchison's lawyer, and sold the rights for $2,500. Murchison then decided to create his own team, with the support of NFL expansion committee chairman, George Halas. Halas decided to put the proposition of a Dallas franchise before the NFL owners, which needed to have unanimous approval in order to pass. The only owner against the proposal was George Preston Marshall. However, Marshall found out that Murchison owned the rights to Washington's fight song, so a deal was finally struck. If Marshall showed his approval of the Dallas franchise, Murchison would return the song. The Cowboys were then founded and began playing in 1960. At the time in 2016, a matchup between the teams on Thanksgiving was the most-watched regular-season game broadcast by the NFL on Fox.

Philadelphia Eagles

The Commanders' rivalry with the Philadelphia Eagles began October 21, 1934, during Washington's first year under the Boston Redskins moniker; the Redskins defeated the Eagles 6–0 at Fenway Park. Washington leads the series 87–80–8. The Eagles have won 12 of the last 20 matchups since 2010.

New York Giants

Players and staff

Roster

Staff

Retired numbers

Unofficially retired
Some numbers are unofficially retired and are usually withheld from being selected by other players. The following numbers fall into that category.
 7 Joe Theismann, QB, 1974–1985
 28 Darrell Green, CB, 1983–2002
 42 Charley Taylor, WR, 1964–1977
 43 Larry Brown, RB, 1969–1976
 44 John Riggins, RB, 1976–1979, 1981–1985
 65 Dave Butz, DT, 1975–1988
 70 Sam Huff, LB, 1964–1969
 81 Art Monk, WR, 1980–1993

The use of unofficial retired numbers drew controversy during Steve Spurrier's first year as head coach. Quarterbacks Danny Wuerffel and Shane Matthews first wore 7 and 9 respectively during training camp. The resulting controversy led to them switching to 17 and 6. During the season, reserve tight end Leonard Stephens wore number 49 for the season. After his retirement as assistant general manager, Bobby Mitchell criticized the team for not being considered for a promotion and how the team would let another player wear his number. The team's first-round selection in the 2019 NFL Draft, quarterback Dwayne Haskins, wore number 7 when he played for the Ohio State Buckeyes and wore it with the team after being granted permission from Theismann.

Pro Football Hall of Fame members

Names in bold indicate induction primarily based on accomplishments with Washington.

Ring of Fame
When the team left RFK Stadium in 1996, the signs commemorating the Washington Hall of Stars were left behind and the team began a new tradition of honoring Redskins greats via the "Ring of Fame", a set of signs on the upper level facade at FedExField. Unlike the Hall of Stars, which honors historical greats from all sports, the Ring of Fame is limited to honoring Redskins greats. Team founder George Preston Marshall is the only member to ever be removed once inducted, which was done in 2020. Highlighted players are also members of the Pro Football Hall of Fame.

90 Greatest

In honor of the Redskins' 70th anniversary in 2002, a panel selected the 70 Greatest Redskins to honor the players and coaches who were significant on-field contributors to the Redskins five championships. They were honored in a weekend of festivities, including a special halftime ceremony during a Redskins' win over the Indianapolis Colts. In 2012, ten more players and personnel were added to the list for the team's 80th anniversary. In 2022, ten more players were added in honor of the franchise's 90th anniversary.

The panel that chose the 70 consisted of former news anchor Bernard Shaw; former player Bobby Mitchell; Senator George Allen (son of coach George Allen); broadcaster Ken Beatrice; Noel Epstein, editor for the Washington Post; former diplomat Joseph J. Sisco; Phil Hochberg, who retired in 2001 after 38 years as team stadium announcer; Pro Football Hall of Fame historian Joe Horrigan; sportscaster George Michael; sports director Andy Pollin; NFL Films president Steven Sabol; and news anchor Jim Vance.

The list includes three head coaches and 67 players, of which 41 were offensive players, 23 defensive players and three special teams players. Among the 70 Greatest, there are 92 Super Bowl appearances, with 47 going once and 45 playing in more than one. 29 members possess one Super Bowl ring and 26 have more than one. Also, before the Super Bowl, members of the 70 made 18 World Championship appearances including six that participated in the Redskins' NFL Championship victories in 1937 and 1942. Bold indicates those elected to the Pro Football Hall of Fame.

Individual awards

Command Force

The Command Force is the team's professional dance and performance group. They were originally formed in 1962 as a cheerleading squad known as the Redskinettes, named after the team's former Redskins name. They were revamped as the Command Force upon the team's rebranding as the Commanders in 2022. They have also been referred to as the First Ladies of Football.

Records

Single-game
 Receptions: 14 Roy Helu (2011)
 Completions: 33 Jason Campbell (2007), Kirk Cousins (2015)
 Longest field goal: 59 yards Graham Gano (2011)
 Sacks: 4 Dexter Manley (1988), Ken Harvey (1997), Phillip Daniels (2005), Brian Orakpo (2009), Ryan Kerrigan (2014)
 Interceptions: 4 Deangelo Hall (2010)

Season
 Passing yards: 4,917 Kirk Cousins (2016)
 Passing touchdowns: 31 Sonny Jurgensen (1967)
 Rushing yards: 1,613 Alfred Morris (2012)
 Receptions: 113 Pierre Garçon (2013)
 Receiving yards: 1,483 Santana Moss (2005)
 Pass interceptions: 13 Dan Sandifer (1948)
 Sacks: 18.5 Dexter Manley (1986)
 Forced fumbles: 6 LaVar Arrington (2003)
 Field goals made: 33 Mark Moseley (1983)
 Points: 161 Mark Moseley (1983)
 Total touchdowns: 24 John Riggins (1983)
 Punt return average (minimum 5 returns): 24.3 yards Derrick Shepard (1987)
 Kickoff return average (minimum 5 returns): 42.8 yards Hall Haynes (1950)
 Punting average: 51.4 yards* Sammy Baugh (1940)
* Also an NFL record

Franchise
 Passing yards: 25,206 Joe Theismann (1974–1985)
 Passing touchdowns: 187 Sammy Baugh (1937–1952)
 Rushing yards: 7,472 John Riggins (1976–1979, 1981–1985)
 Receptions: 889 Art Monk (1980–1993)
 Receiving yards: 12,029 Art Monk (1980–1993)
 Pass interceptions: 54 Darrell Green (1983–2002)
 Field goals made: 263 Mark Moseley (1974–1986)
 Points: 1,207 Mark Moseley (1974–1986)
 Total touchdowns: 90 Charley Taylor (1964–1977)
 Punt return average (minimum 25 returns): 13.8.0 Bob Seymour (1941–1944)
 Kickoff return average (minimum 25 returns): 28.5 Bobby Mitchell (1962–1968)
 Punting average: 45.1 Sammy Baugh (1937–1952)
 Sacks: 95.5 Ryan Kerrigan (2011–2020)
 Forced fumbles: 17 Charles Mann (1983–1993)

NFL records

Offense
 The Redskins scored 541 points in 1983, which is the sixth highest total in a season of all time.
 The Redskins' 72 points against the New York Giants on November 27, 1966, are the most points ever scored by an NFL team in a regular-season game, and the 72–41 score amounted to 113 points and the highest-scoring game ever in NFL history. The second-half scoring for the game amounted to 65 points, the second-highest point total for second-half scoring and the third-highest total scoring in any half in NFL history. The Redskins' 10 touchdowns are the most by a team in a single game, and the 16 total touchdowns are the most combined for a game. The Redskins' nine PATs are the second-most all-time for a single game, and the 14 combined PATs are the most ever in a game.
 The Redskins set a record for most first downs in a game with 39 in a game against the Lions on November 4, 1990. They also set a record by not allowing a single first down against the Giants on September 27, 1942.
 The Redskins have led the league in passing eight times: in 1938, 1940, 1944, 1947–48, 1967, 1974 and 1989. Only the San Diego Chargers have led more times. The Redskins led the league in completion percentage 11 times: in 1937, 1939–1940, 1942–45, 1947–48 and 1969–1970, second only to the San Francisco 49ers. Their four straight years from 1942 to 1945 is the second longest streak.
 The Redskins' nine sacks allowed in 1991 are the third-fewest allowed in a season.
 The Redskins completed 43 passes in an overtime win against Detroit on November 4, 1990, second-most all-time.

Defense
 The Redskins recovered eight opponent's fumbles against the St. Louis Cardinals on October 25, 1976, the most ever in one game.
 The Redskins allowed 82 first downs in 1937, third fewest all-time.
 The Redskins have led the league in fewest total yards allowed five times, 1935–37, 1939, and 1946, which is the third most. Their three consecutive years from 1935 to 1937 is an NFL record.
 The Redskins have led the league in fewest passing yards allowed seven times, in 1939, 1942, 1945, 1952–53, 1980, and 1985, second only to Green Bay (10).
 The Redskins had 61 defensive turnovers in 1983, the third most all-time. The turnover differential of +43 that year was the highest of all time.
 The Redskins had only 12 defensive turnovers in 2006, the fewest in a 16-game season and second all time (the Baltimore Colts had 11 turnovers in the strike-shortened 1982 season which lasted only nine games.)

Special teams
 The Redskins led the league in field goals for eight seasons, –77, . Only the Green Bay Packers have ever led more.
 The Redskins and Bears attempted an NFL record 11 field goals on November 14, 1971, and the Redskins and Giants tied that mark on November 14, 1976.
 The Redskins have led the league in punting average six times, in 1940–43, 1945, and 1958, second only to the Denver Broncos. Their four consecutive years from 1940 to 1943 is an NFL record.
 The Redskins have led the league in average kickoff return yards eight times, in 1942, 1947, 1962–63, 1973–74, 1981, and 1995, more than any other team.

Broadcasting

The franchise's flagship station is WBIG-FM, the station having been selected as the official broadcast home of Commanders games after the team had signed a marketing partnership with their owner iHeartMedia in April 2022, which would include both the team making appearances at the company's stations' promotional events and concerts, as well as the company's stations making appearances at the team's promotional events such as draft parties and training camp. The team's longtime broadcast home was previously WTEM, by virtue of previously being owned by Red Zebra Broadcasting, a group co-owned by Snyder. In 2018, the station was sold to Urban One, but maintained its rights to the team.

In June 2019, Cumulus Media had co-acquired the team's radio rights and would move it to WSBN. However, WMAL-FM would still carry broadcasts of the franchise's games. Telecasts of preseason games are aired on NBC Sports Washington in the Mid-Atlantic states; WRC-TV simulcasts with NBC Sports Washington in the Washington, D.C., area. In the preseason, Kenny Albert usually does play-by-play while Joe Theismann and Michael Silver respectively serve as the color analyst and sideline reporter. In the regular season, most games are part of the NFL on Fox package, with the main exceptions being when the team hosts an AFC team or plays in primetime. NBC Sports Washington also airs a pre- and post-game show featuring analysis and interviews.

Frank Herzog was the team's lead play-by-play announcer from 1979 to 2004, when he was replaced by Larry Michael. Michael retired in 2020 and was replaced by Bram Weinstein. Weinstein is joined by color analyst London Fletcher, who played linebacker for the team from 2007 to 2013, and host Julie Donaldson, the first woman to be an on-air broadcaster for an NFL team.

U.S. presidential election superstition

Since 1932, for 18 of the past 23 United States presidential elections, a win for the Redskins' last home game prior to Election Day coincided with the incumbent party winning re-election. The exceptions include in 2004, when Republican incumbent George W. Bush won re-election despite the Green Bay Packers beating the Redskins; in 2012, when Democratic incumbent Barack Obama won re-election despite the Redskins losing to the Carolina Panthers; in 2016, when Republican candidate Donald Trump won the election despite the Redskins defeating the Eagles; and in 2020, when Democratic candidate Joe Biden won despite Washington's win. Other than these exceptions, this "Redskins Rule" has proven true since 1936 when they won and incumbent Franklin D. Roosevelt won re-election, prior to the Redskins' move from Boston in 1937. The connection was discovered in 2000 by Steve Hirdt, former executive vice president of the Elias Sports Bureau, while searching for discussion ideas for a game between the Redskins and Tennessee Titans. Since 2000, however, as noted above, there have been four exceptions to the rule.

References

Further reading
 Cronin, Brian. "Were the Washington Redskins once the Duluth Eskimos?" Los Angeles Times, March 15, 2011.
 Richman, Michael. The Redskins Encyclopedia. Philadelphia: Temple University Press, 2009.
 Smith, Thomas G. Showdown: JFK and the Integration of the Washington Redskins. Boston: Beacon Press, 2011.

External links